Alexandra Russ (born 1 May 1970) is a German former swimmer. She competed in two events at the 1988 Summer Olympics representing West Germany.

References

External links
 

1970 births
Living people
German female swimmers
Olympic swimmers of West Germany
Swimmers at the 1988 Summer Olympics
People from Fulda
Sportspeople from Kassel (region)
20th-century German women
21st-century German women